Lukas Graham is the eponymous debut album of Lukas Graham. It was released on 26 March 2012 through Copenhagen Records. The album entered the Danish Albums Chart at number one on and stayed on top of the chart for 15 weeks and was certified six-times platinum. The album includes the singles "Ordinary Things", "Drunk in the Morning", and "Criminal Mind"; the international reissue added "Better Than Yourself (Criminal Mind Pt 2)". Some tracks from this album were added to their second release, also titled Lukas Graham, for its reissue.

Track listing

Chart performance

Weekly charts

Year-end charts

Certifications

Release history

References

2012 debut albums
Lukas Graham albums
European Border Breakers Award-winning albums